Baest is a Danish death metal band formed in 2015 in Aarhus. Their name was initially spelled Bæst, the Danish word for "beast" or "brute". Since signing to Century Media Records in March 2018, the band has released three studio albums: Danse Macabre (2018), Venenum (2019), and Necro Sapiens (2021).

Members
Lasse Revsbech – guitars (2015–present)
Svend Karlsson – guitars (2015–present)
Simon Olsen – vocals (2015–present)
Mattias Melchiorsen – bass (2015–present)
Sebastian Abildsten – drums (2015–present)

Discography
Studio albums
Danse Macabre (2018)
Venenum (2019)
Necro Sapiens (2021)

Extended plays
Marie Magdalene (2016)
Justitia (2022)

Singles
Demo (2016)

References

External links

Official website

Danish death metal musical groups
Musical groups established in 2015
Century Media Records artists
2015 establishments in Denmark